The Embassy of Argentina in Athens is Argentina's foreign mission in Greece. It is located at 59 Vasilissis Sofias Avenue in Athens, the Greek capital.

See also 
 Argentina–Greece relations
 Greek Argentines

References

Argentina
Athens
Argentina–Greece relations